The 2019 Hart District Council election took place on 2 May 2019 to elect members of Hart District Council in England. This was on the same day as other local elections.

Results 

The election saw the Conservatives lose five seats, two each to Community Campaign Hart and the Liberal Democrats, and one an Independent Candidate. The council remained under no overall control, with the Conservative party and Community Campaign the joint largest parties with eleven seats each overall. Subsequently, an administration was formed by Community Campaign Hart and the Liberal Democrats, with Liberal Democrat Councillor David Neighbour becoming leader of the council, and Community Campaign Hart Councillor James Radley becoming deputy leader of the council.

Results summary

Ward results

Blackwater & Hawley

Crookham East

Crookham West & Ewshot

Fleet Central

Fleet East

Fleet West

Hartley Wintney

Hook

Odiham

Yateley East

Yateley West

References

2019 English local elections
2019
2010s in Hampshire